The 1976 Melbourne Cup was a 3200 metre handicap horse race which took place on Tuesday, 2 November 1976.

This year was the hundred and sixteenth running of the Melbourne Cup.

This is the list of placegetters for the 1976 Melbourne Cup.

See also

 Melbourne Cup
 List of Melbourne Cup winners
 Victoria Racing Club

References

External links
1976 Melbourne Cup footyjumpers.com

1976
Melbourne Cup
Melbourne Cup
20th century in Melbourne
1970s in Melbourne